Juan Sandoval Íñiguez (born 28 March 1933 in Yahualica de González Gallo, Jalisco, Mexico) is a cardinal of the Roman Catholic Church, and served as Archbishop of Guadalajara.

Ecclesiastical career
He is a son of Esteban Sandoval Ruiz and María Guadalupe Íñiguez de Sandoval, and is the eldest of 12 brothers and sisters, of whom 2 died as infants and another was killed.

Sandoval entered the seminary in 1945 and then went to Rome where he continued his studies.  He was ordained a priest in Rome in 1957.

In 1961, he returned to Mexico and was assigned to the seminary in Guadalajara, Jalisco, where he worked first as a teacher and then as rector.

In 1988 Sandoval was named Coadjutor bishop of Ciudad Juárez, Chihuahua, and succeeded as its bishop in 1992. He was invested as Archbishop of Guadalajara in April 1994, replacing the murdered former incumbent, Cardinal Juan Jesús Posadas Ocampo, and later that year he was named a cardinal.

He was one of the cardinal electors who participated in the 2005 papal conclave that elected Pope Benedict XVI. Cardinal Sandoval has also made regular appearances on the Mexican Catholic network "Mariavisión", which is based in Guadalajara, normally by teaching the catechism during short episodes between regular programming.

On 7 December 2011 his retirement was accepted by Pope Benedict XVI; Cardinal Francisco Robles Ortega was appointed his successor.

He was one of the cardinal electors who participated in the 2013 papal conclave that elected Pope Francis.

Political controversy
Sandoval has intervened in political issues at the national level.

He has organized opposition to the use of condoms, sex education, emergency contraceptive pills. In August 2010 he entered the debate on the legalisation of gay marriage in Mexico by accusing justices of the Mexican Supreme Court of having accepted bribes from the Party of the Democratic Revolution (PRD) and the PRD mayor of Mexico City, Marcelo Ebrard, to uphold the Mexico City statute that legalises both gay marriage and gay adoption of children. Ebrard filed suit against him in the civil courts in Mexico City for defamation after Sandoval refused to retract his comments.

He has made several controversial statements. He has said, "To be a Protestant, one cannot have any shame"; and on women rape victims he has been quoted as saying: "Women should not go around being so provocative; because of this there are so many rapes." He has been criticised by gay rights groups for using the term "maricón" (Spanish equivalent to "fag") to describe homosexuals, which is regarded as insulting.

In 2015, following the legalization of same-sex marriage in Mexico, Sandoval, along with Archbishop Carlos Cabrero and the Spanish exorcist José Antonio Fortea, performed a mass exorcism against "abortion, Satanism, corruption, the cult of 'holy' death and the legalization of sexual aberrations."

Facebook placed a warning screen over a rambling chat by Sandoval Iñiguez on 12 January, 2021, in which he claimed COVID-19 vaccines contain a satanic microchip.

Cardinal Íñiguez was admitted to hospital on 3 February 2021 after suffering heart failure but according to the archdiocese he has since recovered.

References

External links and additional sources

 (for Chronology of Bishops)
 (for Chronology of Bishops)
 
Archdiocese of Guadalajara

1933 births
Living people
People from Yahualica, Jalisco
Mexican anti-same-sex-marriage activists
Mexican cardinals
Roman Catholic archbishops of Guadalajara
Cardinals created by Pope John Paul II
Members of the Pontifical Council for Culture